The 2018–19 UEFA Nations League D was the fourth and lowest division of the 2018–19 edition of the UEFA Nations League, the inaugural season of the international football competition involving the men's national teams of the 55 member associations of UEFA.

Format
League D consisted of the lowest 16 UEFA members ranked from 40–55, who were split into four groups of four. The top two teams of each group, as well as the best ranked third-place team, were promoted to the 2020–21 UEFA Nations League C.

In addition, League D was allocated one of the four remaining UEFA Euro 2020 places. Four teams from League D which had not already qualified for the European Championship finals competed in the play-offs for each division, which were played in October and November 2020. The play-off berths were first allocated to the group winners, and if any of the group winners had already qualified for the European Championship finals, then to the next best ranked team of the division, etc. If there were fewer than four teams in League D which had not already qualified for the European Championship finals, and League D had no group winner available, the best team in the overall ranking would be selected. The play-offs consisted of two "one-off" semi-finals (best-ranked team vs. fourth best-ranked team and second best-ranked team vs. third best-ranked team, played at home of higher-ranked teams) and one "one-off" final between the two semi-final winners (venue drawn in advance between semi-final 1 and 2).

Seeding
Teams were allocated to League D according to their UEFA national team coefficients after the conclusion of the 2018 FIFA World Cup qualifying group stage on 11 October 2017. Teams were split into four pots of four teams, ordered based on their UEFA national team coefficient. The seeding pots for the draw were announced on 7 December 2017.

The group draw took place at the SwissTech Convention Center in Lausanne, Switzerland on 24 January 2018, 12:00 CET. For political reasons, Armenia and Azerbaijan could not be drawn into the same group (due to the Nagorno-Karabakh conflict). Due to excessive travel restrictions, any group could only contain a maximum of one of the following pairs: Andorra and Kazakhstan, Faroe Islands and Kazakhstan, Gibraltar and Kazakhstan, Gibraltar and Azerbaijan.

Groups
The fixture list was confirmed by UEFA on 24 January 2018 following the draw.

Times are CET/CEST, as listed by UEFA (local times, if different, are in parentheses).

Group 1

Group 2

Group 3

Group 4

Ranking of third-placed teams

Goalscorers

Overall ranking
The 16 League D teams were ranked 40th to 55th overall in the 2018–19 UEFA Nations League according to the following rules:
The teams finishing first in the groups were ranked 40th to 43rd according to the results of the league phase.
The teams finishing second in the groups were ranked 44th to 47th according to the results of the league phase.
The teams finishing third in the groups were ranked 48th to 51st according to the results of the league phase.
The teams finishing fourth in the groups were ranked 52nd to 55th according to the results of the league phase.

Prize money
The prize money to be distributed was announced in March 2018. Each team in League D received a solidarity fee of €500,000. In addition, the four group winners received double this amount with a €500,000 bonus fee. This meant that the maximum amount of solidarity and bonus fees for a team from League D was €1 million.

Euro 2020 qualifying play-offs

The four best teams in League D according to the overall ranking that did not qualify for UEFA Euro 2020 through the qualifying group stage competed in the play-offs, with the winners qualifying for the final tournament. If there had been fewer than four teams in League D that had not qualified, the remaining slots would have been allocated to teams from another league, according to the overall ranking.

Notes

References

External links

League D